Mishkinsky District is the name of several administrative and municipal districts in Russia:
Mishkinsky District, Republic of Bashkortostan, an administrative and municipal district of the Republic of Bashkortostan
Mishkinsky District, Kurgan Oblast, an administrative and municipal district of Kurgan Oblast

See also
Mishkinsky

References